Daniel Winkler (born 17 May 1962) is a German gymnast. He competed at the 1984 Summer Olympics and the 1988 Summer Olympics.

References

External links
 

1962 births
Living people
German male artistic gymnasts
Olympic gymnasts of West Germany
Gymnasts at the 1984 Summer Olympics
Gymnasts at the 1988 Summer Olympics
Sportspeople from Darmstadt
20th-century German people